Ryan Worsley is a Canadian record producer, recording engineer and songwriter based in Vancouver, British Columbia.

Career 
Worsley started Echoplant Recording Studios in 2007 and in 2015 purchased the former Vogville Studio. He has worked with artists including Juno award winners Dear Rouge and MONOWHALES, The Treble, Juno nominated Nuela Charles, The Written Years, Sophia Danai. Worsley's collaborations with Dear Rouge have included production and engineering on their 2015 debut album Black to Gold and their 2018 second album PHASES. In 2017, Ryan participated in the "Mix with the Masters" seminar with producer Tchad Blake.

Awards and nominations

References

External links
Ryan Worsley website

Year of birth missing (living people)
Living people
Canadian songwriters
Writers from Vancouver